The Torzym-Cybinka oil field is an oil field located in Torzym/Cybinka, Lubusz Voivodeship. It was discovered in 2012 and developed by Aurelian Oil & Gas and Romgaz, Sceptre Oil and Gas. It will begin production in 2018 and will produce oil, natural gas and condensates.

References

Oil fields of Poland
Natural gas fields in Poland